Immunohistochemistry (IHC) is the most common application of immunostaining. It involves the process of selectively identifying antigens (proteins) in cells of a tissue section by exploiting the principle of antibodies binding specifically to antigens in biological tissues.  IHC takes its name from the roots "immuno", in reference to antibodies used in the procedure, and "histo", meaning tissue (compare to immunocytochemistry). Albert Coons conceptualized and first implemented the procedure in 1941.

Visualising an antibody-antigen interaction can be accomplished in a number of ways, mainly either of the following:
 Chromogenic immunohistochemistry (CIH), wherein an antibody is conjugated to an enzyme, such as peroxidase (the combination being termed immunoperoxidase), that can catalyse a colour-producing reaction.
 Immunofluorescence, where the antibody is tagged to a fluorophore, such as fluorescein or rhodamine.

Immunohistochemical staining is widely used in the diagnosis of abnormal cells such as those found in cancerous tumors. Specific molecular markers are characteristic of particular cellular events such as proliferation or cell death (apoptosis).
Immunohistochemistry is also widely used in basic research to understand the distribution and localization of biomarkers and differentially expressed proteins in different parts of a biological tissue.

Sample preparation

Preparation of the sample is critical to maintain cell morphology, tissue architecture and the antigenicity of target epitopes.  This requires proper tissue collection, fixation and sectioning. A solution of formalin is often used to fix tissue, but other methods may be used.

Preparing tissue slices 
The tissue may then be sliced or used whole, dependent upon the purpose of the experiment or the tissue itself. Before sectioning, the tissue sample may be embedded in a medium, like paraffin wax or cryomedia. Sections can be sliced on a variety of instruments, most commonly a microtome, cryostat, or vibratome. Specimens are typically sliced at a range of 3 µm-5 μm. The slices are then mounted on slides, dehydrated using alcohol washes of increasing concentrations (e.g., 50%, 75%, 90%, 95%, 100%), and cleared using a solvent like xylene before being imaged under a microscope.

Depending on the method of fixation and tissue preservation, the sample may require additional steps to make the epitopes available for antibody binding, including deparaffinization and antigen retrieval. For formalin-fixed paraffin-embedded tissues, antigen-retrieval is often necessary, and involves pre-treating the sections with heat or protease.   These steps may make the difference between the target antigens staining or not staining.

Reducing non-specific immuno-staining 
Depending on the tissue type and the method of antigen detection, endogenous biotin or enzymes may need to be blocked or quenched, respectively, prior to antibody staining.
Although antibodies show preferential avidity for specific epitopes, they may partially or weakly bind to sites on nonspecific proteins (also called reactive sites) that are similar to the cognate binding sites on the target antigen.  A great amount of non-specific binding causes high background staining which will mask the detection of the target antigen. To reduce background staining in IHC, ICC and other immunostaining methods, samples are incubated with a buffer that blocks the reactive sites to which the primary or secondary antibodies may otherwise bind. Common blocking buffers include normal serum, non-fat dry milk, BSA, or gelatin.  Commercial blocking buffers with proprietary formulations are available for greater efficiency. Methods to eliminate background staining include dilution of the primary or secondary antibodies, changing the time or temperature of incubation, and using a different detection system or different primary antibody. Quality control should as a minimum include a tissue known to express the antigen as a positive control and negative controls of tissue known not to express the antigen, as well as the test tissue probed in the same way with omission of the primary antibody (or better, absorption of the primary antibody).

Sample labeling

Antibody types
The antibodies used for specific detection can be polyclonal or monoclonal. Polyclonal antibodies are made by injecting animals with the protein of interest, or a peptide fragment and, after a secondary immune response is stimulated, isolating antibodies from whole serum. Thus, polyclonal antibodies are a heterogeneous mix of antibodies that recognize several epitopes. Monoclonal antibodies are made by injecting the animal and then taking a specific sample of immune tissue, isolating a parent cell, and using the resulting immortalized line to create antibodies. This causes the antibodies to show specificity for a single epitope.

For immunohistochemical detection strategies, antibodies are classified as primary or secondary reagents. Primary antibodies are raised against an antigen of interest and are typically unconjugated (unlabeled), while secondary antibodies are raised against immunoglobulins of the primary antibody species. The secondary antibody is usually conjugated to a linker molecule, such as biotin, that then recruits reporter molecules, or the secondary antibody itself is directly bound to the reporter molecule.

IHC reporters
Reporter molecules vary based on the nature of the detection method, the most popular being chromogenic and fluorescence detection mediated by an enzyme or a fluorophore, respectively. With chromogenic reporters, an enzyme label reacts with a substrate to yield an intensely colored product that can be analyzed with an ordinary light microscope. While the list of enzyme substrates is extensive, alkaline phosphatase (AP) and horseradish peroxidase (HRP) are the two enzymes used most extensively as labels for protein detection. An array of chromogenic, fluorogenic and chemiluminescent substrates is available for use with either enzyme, including DAB or BCIP/NBT, which produce a brown or purple staining, respectively, wherever the enzymes are bound. Reaction with DAB can be enhanced using nickel, producing a deep purple/black staining.

Fluorescent reporters are small, organic molecules used for IHC detection and traditionally include FITC, TRITC and AMCA, while commercial derivatives, including the Alexa Fluors and Dylight Fluors, show similar enhanced performance but vary in price. For chromogenic and fluorescent detection methods, densitometric analysis of the signal can provide semi- and fully quantitative data, respectively, to correlate the level of reporter signal to the level of protein expression or localization.

Target antigen detection methods
The direct method is a one-step staining method and involves a labeled antibody (e.g. FITC-conjugated antiserum) reacting directly with the antigen in tissue sections. While this technique utilizes only one antibody and therefore is simple and rapid, the sensitivity is lower due to little signal amplification, in contrast to indirect approaches. However, this strategy is used less frequently than its multi-phase counterpart.

The indirect method involves an unlabeled primary antibody (first layer) that binds to the target antigen in the tissue and a labeled secondary antibody (second layer) that reacts with the primary antibody. As mentioned above, the secondary antibody must be raised against the IgG of the animal species in which the primary antibody has been raised. This method is more sensitive than direct detection strategies because of signal amplification due to the binding of several secondary antibodies to each primary antibody if the secondary antibody is conjugated to the fluorescent or enzyme reporter.

Further amplification can be achieved if the secondary antibody is conjugated to several biotin molecules, which can recruit complexes of avidin-, streptavidin- or NeutrAvidin protein-bound enzyme. The difference between these three biotin-binding proteins is their individual binding affinity to endogenous tissue targets leading to nonspecific binding and high background; the ranking of these proteins based on their nonspecific binding affinities, from highest to lowest, is: 1) avidin, 2) streptavidin and 3) NeutrAvidin protein.

The indirect method, aside from its greater sensitivity, also has the advantage that only a relatively small number of standard conjugated (labeled) secondary antibodies needs to be generated. For example, a labeled secondary antibody raised against rabbit IgG, which can be purchased "off the shelf", is useful with any primary antibody raised in rabbit. This is possible because all rabbit IgG in this example would have the same Fc (constant) region, thus even with a small number of anti-rabbit secondary antibodies generated, each could adhere to any primary rabbit antibody. This is particularly useful when a researcher is labeling more than one primary antibody, whether due to polyclonal selection producing an array of primary antibodies for a singular antigen or when there is interest in multiple antigens. With the direct method, it would be necessary to label each primary antibody for every antigen of interest.

Counterstains
After immunohistochemical staining of the target antigen, a second stain is often applied to provide contrast that helps the primary stain stand out. Many of these stains show specificity for specific classes of biomolecules, while others will stain the whole cell. Both chromogenic and fluorescent dyes are available for IHC to provide a vast array of reagents to fit every experimental design, and include: hematoxylin, Hoechst stain and DAPI are commonly used.

Troubleshooting
In immunohistochemical techniques, there are several steps prior to the final staining of the tissue antigen, which can cause a variety of problems including strong background staining, weak target antigen staining, and autofluorescence. Endogenous biotin or reporter enzymes or primary/secondary antibody cross-reactivity are common causes of strong background staining, while weak staining may be caused by poor enzyme activity or primary antibody potency. Furthermore, autofluorescence may be due to the nature of the tissue or the fixation method. These aspects of IHC tissue prep and antibody staining must be systematically addressed to identify and overcome staining issues.

Diagnostic IHC markers

IHC is an excellent detection technique and has the tremendous advantage of being able to show exactly where a given protein is located within the tissue examined. It is also an effective way to examine the tissues. This has made it a widely used technique in the neurosciences, enabling researchers to examine protein expression within specific brain structures. Its major disadvantage is that, unlike immunoblotting techniques where staining is checked against a molecular weight ladder, it is impossible to show in IHC that the staining corresponds with the protein of interest. For this reason, primary antibodies must be well-validated in a Western Blot or similar procedure. The technique is even more widely used in diagnostic surgical pathology for immunophenotyping tumors (e.g. immunostaining for e-cadherin to differentiate between DCIS (ductal carcinoma in situ: stains positive) and LCIS (lobular carcinoma in situ: does not stain positive)). More recently, Immunohistochemical techniques have been useful in differential diagnoses of multiple forms of salivary gland, head, and neck carcinomas.

The diversity of IHC markers used in diagnostic surgical pathology is substantial. Many clinical laboratories in tertiary hospitals will have menus of over 200 antibodies used as diagnostic, prognostic and predictive biomarkers. Examples of some commonly used markers include:
 BrdU: used to identify replicating cells. Used to identify tumors as well as in neuroscience research.
 Cytokeratins: used for identification of carcinomas but may also be expressed in some sarcomas.
 CD15 and CD30 : used for Hodgkin's disease.
 Alpha fetoprotein: for yolk sac tumors and hepatocellular carcinoma.
 CD117 (KIT): for gastrointestinal stromal tumors (GIST) and mast cell tumors.
 CD10 (CALLA): for renal cell carcinoma and acute lymphoblastic leukemia.
 Prostate specific antigen (PSA): for prostate cancer.
 estrogens and progesterone receptor (ER & PR) staining are used both diagnostically (breast and gyn tumors) as well as prognostic in breast cancer and predictive of response to therapy (estrogen receptor).
 Identification of B-cell lymphomas using CD20.
 Identification of T-cell lymphomas using CD3.

 PIN-4 cocktail, targeting p63, CK-5, CK-14 and AMACR (latter also known as P504S), and used to distinguish prostate adenocarcinoma from benign glands.

Directing therapy
A variety of molecular pathways are altered in cancer and some of the alterations can be targeted in cancer therapy.  Immunohistochemistry can be used to assess which tumors are likely to respond to therapy, by detecting the presence or elevated levels of the molecular target.

Chemical inhibitors
Tumor biology allows for a number of potential intracellular targets.  Many tumors are hormone dependent.  The presence of hormone receptors can be used to determine if a tumor is potentially responsive to antihormonal therapy.  One of the first therapies was the antiestrogen, tamoxifen, used to treat breast cancer.  Such hormone receptors can be detected by immunohistochemistry.
Imatinib, an intracellular tyrosine kinase inhibitor, was developed to treat chronic myelogenous leukemia, a disease characterized by the formation of a specific abnormal tyrosine kinase.  Imitanib has proven effective in tumors that express other tyrosine kinases, most notably KIT. Most gastrointestinal stromal tumors express KIT, which can be detected by immunohistochemistry.

Monoclonal antibodies

Many proteins shown to be highly upregulated in pathological states by immunohistochemistry are potential targets for therapies utilising monoclonal antibodies.  Monoclonal antibodies, due to their size, are utilized against cell surface targets.  Among the overexpressed targets are members of the EGFR family, transmembrane proteins with an extracellular receptor domain regulating an intracellular tyrosine kinase. Of these, HER2/neu (also known as Erb-B2) was the first to be developed.  The molecule is highly expressed in a variety of cancer cell types, most notably breast cancer. As such, antibodies against HER2/neu have been FDA approved for clinical treatment of cancer under the drug name Herceptin.  There are commercially available immunohistochemical tests, Dako HercepTest, Leica Biosystems Oracle and Ventana Pathway.

Similarly, EGFR (HER-1) is overexpressed in a variety of cancers including head and neck and colon.  Immunohistochemistry is used to determine patients who may benefit from therapeutic antibodies such as Erbitux (cetuximab). Commercial systems to detect EGFR by immunohistochemistry include the Dako pharmDx.

Mapping protein expression 
Immunohistochemistry can also be used for a more general protein profiling, provided the availability of antibodies validated for immunohistochemistry. The Human Protein Atlas displays a map of protein expression in normal human organs and tissues. The combination of immunohistochemistry and tissue microarrays provides protein expression patterns in a large number of different tissue types. Immunohistochemistry is also used for protein profiling in the most common forms of human cancer.

See also 
 Cutaneous conditions with immunofluorescence findings
 Chromogenic in situ hybridization
 Tissue Cytometry,  a technique that brings the concept of flow cytometry to tissue section, in situ, and helps to perform whole slide scanning and quantification of markers by maintaining the spatial context using machine learning and AI.

References

Further reading

External links 

 
 The Human Protein Atlas
 Overview of Immunohistochemistry--describes all aspects of IHC including sample prep, staining and troubleshooting
 Immunofluorescent Staining of Paraffin-Embedded Tissue (IF-P)
 IHC Tip 1: Antigen retrieval - should I do PIER or HIER?
 Histochemical Staining Methods - University of Rochester Department of Pathology
 Immunohistochemistry Staining Protocol 

 
Histology
Immunologic tests
Protein methods
Anatomical pathology
Staining
Laboratory techniques
Pathology